Line of business (LOB) is a general term which refers to a product or a set of related products that serve a particular customer transaction or business need.
In some industry sectors, like insurance, "line of business" also has a regulatory and accounting definition to meet a statutory set of insurance policies. It may or may not be a strategically relevant business unit.

"Line of business" often refers to an internal corporate business unit, whereas the term "industry" refers to an external view that includes all competitors competing in a similar market.  A line of business will often examine its position within an industry using a Porter five forces analysis (or other industry-analysis method) and other relevant industry information.

Computer applications 
In the context of computing, a "line-of-business application" is one of the set of critical computer applications perceived as vital to running an enterprise. For example:

"Governance has become the hot topic in SOA over the past year. As companies' SOA usage becomes real, widespread and line-of-business, the requirement to ensure that the systems are properly governed has emerged as the number one concern for SOA adopters."

Mobile LOB 
Mobile LOB refers to LOB applications running on mobile computers or PDAs - usually rugged for use in the field to process transaction at the site of the customer with minimum usage of paper.

Mobile route accounting exemplifies a typical mobile application.

See also 
 Industry classification
 North American Industry Classification System (NAICS)
 North American Product Classification System (NAPCS)
 Standard Industrial Classification (SIC)

References 

Business terms